Can Vidalet is a station on line 5 of the Barcelona Metro.

The station is located underneath Carrer de la Maladeta, between Carrer de la Mina and Carrer Hortènsia in Esplugues de Llobregat and L'Hospitalet de Llobregat. It was opened in 1976. Originally and before 1982 was named 'Maladeta'.

The side-platform station has a single ticket hall with two access: 1) career Hortènsia (built in 1976); 2) career Maladeta. The building of the second access (2010) had been long promised but the opinion of the affected neighbours was divided.

Services

See also
List of Barcelona Metro stations
Transport in L'Hospitalet de Llobregat

External links
 Can Vidalet at Trenscat.com
 Nou vestíbul a l'estació de Can Vidalet (in Catalan)

Railway stations in Spain opened in 1976
Barcelona Metro line 5 stations
Railway stations in L'Hospitalet de Llobregat
Transport in Esplugues de Llobregat